Eskaman (also Romanized as Eskamān, Eskamūn, and Esgamān) is a village in Razakan Rural District, in the Central District of Shahriar County, Tehran Province, Iran. At the 2006 census, its population was 1,679, in 416 families.

References 

Populated places in Shahriar County